Shaun Jason Rehn (born 17 August 1971) is a former professional Australian rules footballer who played for the Adelaide Football Club and the Hawthorn Football Club in the Australian Football League (AFL).

Early career 
Rehn grew up on a farm near Arno Bay, South Australia, playing junior football for Arno Bay in the Eastern Eyre Football League. It wasn't until Rehn attended Immanuel College (Australia) that he believed he could play league football. Rehn was invited to try out for the West Adelaide Under 19s despite being from the Port Adelaide zone. He made his senior debut for West Adelaide in 1990, playing two games for the season; Rehn was then selected in the Adelaide Crows inaugural 52-man squad wearing number 52.

AFL career
At 19 Rehn started his AFL career in 1991 with the Adelaide Crows in their inaugural year in the Australian Football League. After some eye catching performances for West Adelaide (who were making a late season charge to the SANFL finals), he made his debut for the Crows against  in Round 18 of the 1991 AFL season at Football Park in Adelaide.

At 6'8" (203 cm) he became a leading ruckmen, but suffered three ACL knee injuries overall on both knees which limited his playing ability. The last of those injuries was sustained when his good knee buckled and twisted after running onto a small rubber circle installed in the centre of the turf ground; the circles had been installed onto grounds to assist umpires with centre bounces, but Rehn's injury, and subsequent legal action, saw the circles swiftly removed from all grounds. Rehn's injury kept him on the sidelines for most of the 1996 season after having spent much of the previous season out with the same injury. His knee injuries restricted him to just 6 games in those two seasons, three in each.

He played 33 games and kicked 7 goals with the Hawks between 2001–2002 before retiring from AFL football.

Throughout his whole career at both Adelaide and Hawthorn, Rehn wore the #52 guernsey, and holds the record for the most games wearing that number. Such high numbers are rare in Australian football, as players with numbers higher than 40 usually exchange them for lower numbers early in their careers. Rehn played in jumper #16 when he played for West Adelaide. Rehn also wore 46 when he started at West Adelaide.

Statistics

|- style="background-color: #EAEAEA"
! scope="row" style="text-align:center" | 1991
|
| 52 || 6 || 3 || 1 || 42 || 35 || 77 || 32 || 3 || 47 || 0.5 || 0.2 || 7.0 || 5.8 || 12.8 || 5.3 || 0.5 || 7.8
|-
! scope="row" style="text-align:center" | 1992
|
| 52 || 20 || 5 || 0 || 131 || 183 || 314 || 111 || 13 || 272 || 0.3 || 0.0 || 6.6 || 9.2 || 15.7 || 5.6 || 0.7 || 13.6
|- style="background-color: #EAEAEA"
! scope="row" style="text-align:center" | 1993
|
| 52 || 17 || 6 || 3 || 104 || 198 || 302 || 110 || 19 || 253 || 0.4 || 0.2 || 6.1 || 11.6 || 17.8 || 6.5 || 1.1 || 14.9
|-
! scope="row" style="text-align:center" | 1994
|
| 52 || 21 || 5 || 8 || 154 || 236 || 390 || 149 || 33 || 401 || 0.2 || 0.4 || 7.3 || 11.2 || 18.6 || 7.1 || 1.6 || 19.1
|- style="background-color: #EAEAEA"
! scope="row" style="text-align:center" | 1995
|
| 52 || 3 || 4 || 3 || 25 || 26 || 51 || 14 || 2 || 15 || 1.3 || 1.0 || 8.3 || 8.7 || 17.0 || 4.7 || 0.7 || 5.0
|-
! scope="row" style="text-align:center" | 1996
|
| 52 || 3 || 2 || 0 || 12 || 8 || 20 || 5 || 1 || 19 || 0.7 || 0.0 || 4.0 || 2.7 || 6.7 || 1.7 || 0.3 || 6.3
|- style="background-color: #EAEAEA"
! scope="row" style="text-align:center" | 1997
|
| 52 || 22 || 11 || 15 || 153 || 112 || 265 || 93 || 27 || 264 || 0.5 || 0.7 || 7.0 || 5.1 || 12.0 || 4.2 || 1.2 || 12.0 
|-
! scope="row" style="text-align:center;" | 1998
|
| 52 || 26 || 5 || 11 || 270 || 176 || 446 || 148 || 38 || 566 || 0.2 || 0.4 || 10.4 || 6.8 || 17.2 || 5.7 || 1.5 || 21.8
|- style="background-color: #EAEAEA"
! scope="row" style="text-align:center" | 1999
|
| 52 || 0 || — || — || — || — || — || — || — || — || — || — || — || — || — || — || — || — 
|-
! scope="row" style="text-align:center" | 2000
|
| 52 || 16 || 14 || 8 || 117 || 92 || 209 || 67 || 21 || 189 || 0.9 || 0.5 || 7.3 || 5.8 || 13.1 || 4.2 || 1.3 || 11.8
|- style="background-color: #EAEAEA"
! scope="row" style="text-align:center" | 2001
|
| 52 || 16 || 6 || 4 || 114 || 69 || 183 || 63 || 17 || 177 || 0.4 || 0.3 || 7.1 || 4.3 || 11.4 || 3.9 || 1.1 || 11.1
|-
! scope="row" style="text-align:center" | 2002
|
| 52 || 17 || 1 || 3 || 84 || 67 || 151 || 40 || 34 || 262 || 0.1 || 0.2 || 4.9 || 3.9 || 8.9 || 2.4 || 2.0 || 15.4
|- class="sortbottom"
! colspan=3| Career
! 167
! 62
! 56
! 1206
! 1202
! 2408
! 832
! 208
! 2465
! 0.4
! 0.3
! 7.2
! 7.2
! 14.4
! 5.0
! 1.2
! 14.8
|}

Post-playing career
From 2003 to 2005, Rehn was the coach of the West Adelaide Football Club in the SANFL, leading them to the Grand Final in his debut season as coach.

In 2006, Rehn joined the Brisbane Lions as ruck coach where he helped develop Brisbane's young ruck division including Jamie Charman, Cameron Wood and Matthew Leuenberger.

In 2011 Rehn coached South Australia in the 2011 State of Origin Slowdown to a 17.10 (112) to 17.9 (111) victory over Victoria in a charity match at the Adelaide Oval for the Little Heroes Foundation and the Reach Foundation youth charities started by former Melbourne ruckman and 1991 Brownlow Meadallist Jim Stynes.

On 19 October 2011, Port Adelaide announced that Rehn would be an assistant coach at the club.

References

External links

Adelaide Football Club players
Adelaide Football Club Premiership players
Malcolm Blight Medal winners
1971 births
Living people
All-Australians (AFL)
Hawthorn Football Club players
West Adelaide Football Club players
West Adelaide Football Club coaches
Australian rules footballers from South Australia
South Australian Football Hall of Fame inductees
Australia international rules football team players
People educated at Immanuel College, Adelaide
Two-time VFL/AFL Premiership players